Kazemabad or Kazimabad or Kazmabad may refer to:

Azerbaijan
 Kazımabad, a municipality in Azerbaijan

Iran

Alborz Province
 Kazemabad, Alborz, a village in Nazarabad County

Ardabil Province
 Kazemabad, Ardabil, a village in Meshgin Shahr County

Fars Province
Kazemabad, Darab, a village in Darab County
Kazemabad, Fasa, a village in Fasa County
Kazemabad, Sepidan, a village in Sepidan County

Gilan Province
 Kazemabad, Gilan, a village in Shaft County

Kerman Province
 Kazemabad, Kerman, a city in Kerman County
 Kazemabad, Bezenjan, a village in Baft County
 Kazemabad, Dashtab, a village in Baft County
 Kazemabad, Fahraj, a village in Fahraj County
 Kazemabad, Shahdad, a village in Kerman County
 Kazemabad, Rafsanjan, a village in Rafsanjan County
 Kazemabad, Kabutar Khan, a village in Rafsanjan County
 Kazemabad, Zeydabad, a village in Sirjan County

Kurdistan Province
 Kazemabad, Kamyaran, a village in Kamyaran County
 Kazemabad, Qorveh, a village in Qorveh County

Lorestan Province
 Kazemabad, Aligudarz, a village in Aligudarz County
 Kazemabad, Mirbag-e Jonubi, a village in Delfan County
 Kazemabad, Mirbag-e Shomali, a village in Delfan County
 Kazemabad, Nurabad, a village in Delfan County
 Kazemabad, Kuhdasht, a village in Kuhdasht County
 Kazemabad, Selseleh, a village in Selseleh County
 Kazemabad, alternate name of Aliabad-e Bar Anazar, a village in Selseleh County

Markazi Province
 Kazemabad, Farahan, a village in Farahan County
 Kazemabad, Khomeyn, a village in Khomeyn County
 Kazemabad, Saveh, a village in Saveh County

Mazandaran Province
 Kazemabad, Mazandaran, a village in Tonekabon County

Razavi Khorasan Province
 Kazemabad, Bardaskan, a village in Bardaskan County
 Kazemabad, Mashhad, a village in Mashhad County
 Kazemabad-e Panjshanbeh, a village in Mashhad County
 Kazemabad, Nishapur, a village in Nishapur County
 Kazemabad, Zeberkhan, a village in Nishapur County
 Kazemabad, Rashtkhvar, a village in Rashtkhvar County

South Khorasan Province
 Kazemabad, South Khorasan, a village in Tabas County

Tehran Province
 Kazemabad, Tehran, a village in Robat Karim County

See also
Qasimabad (disambiguation), a different name also referring to several places